The Old Iroquois County Courthouse, now known as the Iroquois County Museum, is a history museum in Watseka, Illinois, which served as the Iroquois County courthouse from 1866 until 1964. The Italianate building was designed by C.B. Leach and built by contractor A.C. Mantor. In addition to housing county courts and offices, the building also served as the county jail and sheriff's residence. In 1881, an addition was placed on the building, and the courthouse's octagonal tower was replaced by a square tower. A second addition was constructed in 1927; in the same year, the courthouse's copper dome was removed and replaced by a mansard roof.

When a new courthouse was built in 1964, county officials planned to demolish the old courthouse; however, local outcry convinced the county to temporarily save the building. The courthouse sat disused and neglected until 1967, when the Iroquois County Historical Society formed and purchased the building for a museum. The museum is the home of the county's genealogical records library and includes collections of minerals and fossils, Native American artifacts, antique dolls, and numerous other historical items. The original courtroom is now used as a theater and concert hall.

The courthouse was added to the National Register of Historic Places on June 13, 1975.

References

External links
 Iroqouis County Historical Society: Old Courthouse Museum

Courthouses on the National Register of Historic Places in Illinois
Italianate architecture in Illinois
Government buildings completed in 1866
Buildings and structures in Iroquois County, Illinois
County courthouses in Illinois
Museums in Iroquois County, Illinois
1866 establishments in Illinois
History museums in Illinois
National Register of Historic Places in Iroquois County, Illinois